Levan Abashidze (22 May 1963, Tbilisi - 7 September 1992, Sukhumi) was a Georgian actor. In 1985 Levan graduated from Shota Rustaveli Institute of theater and performing arts in Tbilisi. Following year, Levan played a leading role in various Georgian films such as "Steps" (1986), "The Journey of a Young Composer" (1986), "Guest" (1987),  and "Roots" (ფესვები) in 1987. His last film ("Bravo, Djordano, Bravo) was in 1993 before he volunteered to fight in the armed conflict in Abkhazia (Georgia). During the separatist offensive on Sukhumi in 1993, Levan Abashidze was killed defending Gumista River entrenchment of the Georgian forces. His death caused a serious outcry in the film and theater studios all across Georgia.

External links
 
 Levan Abashidze on geocinema
 Biography on kino-teatr.ru

Male film actors from Georgia (country)
People's Artists of Georgia
Actors from Tbilisi
1963 births
1992 deaths
Burials at Didube Pantheon
20th-century male actors from Georgia (country)